Bordaia is a genus of moths of the family Hepialidae. There are five described species, all endemic to Australia.

Species 

Bordaia furva 
Bordaia karnka
Bordaia moesta
Bordaia paradoxa
Bordaia pica

External links
Australian Hepialidae
Images at Australian Moths Online: B. furva, B. karnka, B. pica

Hepialidae
Exoporia genera
Taxa named by Norman Tindale